Daniil Dmytrovyh Solomakha (born 12 June 1996) is a Ukrainian amateur football striker who plays for Univer-Dynamo Kharkiv.

Career
Solomakha is a product of the UFC Kharkiv and Dynamo Kyiv Youth School Systems.

He made his debut for FC Metalist in the match against FC Olimpik Donetsk on 17 May 2015 in the Ukrainian Premier League.

Controversy
In September 2016 he admitted, that took part in the fixed match of the FC Metalist Kharkiv Youth against FC Volyn Lutsk Youth, that held place on 6 August 2015.

References

External links

1996 births
Living people
Ukrainian footballers
Association football forwards
Ukraine youth international footballers
FC Dynamo Kyiv players
FC Metalist Kharkiv players
FC Vovchansk players
FC Solli Plyus Kharkiv players
Ukrainian Premier League players
Ukrainian Amateur Football Championship players
Sportspeople involved in betting scandals
Match fixers